Mortimer McCarthy (15 April 1882 – 11 August 1967) was an Irish sailor and polar explorer.

Early life
McCarthy was born in Kinsale, County Cork, Ireland on 15 April 1882. He started his career as a mariner at the age of 12, when he joined the Royal Navy as a boy seaman. He received the South Africa war medal for serving during the Second Boer War. McCarthy left the navy and moved to New Zealand in 1907, where he became a merchant seaman.

Polar exploration

In 1910, McCarthy volunteered to join the British Antarctic Expedition under Captain Robert Falcon Scott. With Scott, he made three Antarctic voyages. He served on the crew on Scott's failed 1912-13 Terra Nova Expedition which attempted to reach the South Pole. For his service with this expedition he received the Silver Polar Medal from King George V at a Buckingham Palace investiture. After failing in his attempt to get a place on another Antarctic expedition, on Endurance with Sir Ernest Shackleton for the Imperial Trans-Antarctic Expedition, he joined the Northern Exploration Company in Tromsø in Northern Norway which gave him the opportunity to work in the Arctic.

First World War
McCarthy rejoined the Royal Navy to serve on destroyers during the First World War. He settled again in Lyttelton, New Zealand in 1920.

Later life
In 1963, at 84 years old, as one of the last three living survivors of Scott's Antarctic expedition, he accepted an invitation from the American Antarctic Survey to visit the Antarctic once more. On the trip he became the oldest person to ever visit the South Pole. He died in New Zealand in 1967 aged 85.

Family
He had three sons with his wife Ellen Coughlan who he married in 1923 and who was also from Kinsale.

Memorials

Mount McCarthy in Antarctica is named after him. McCarthy's brother, Tim, was also a sailor and polar explorer, and in September 2000 joint statues of the two of them were unveiled in their home town of Kinsale.

Notes

References

1882 births
1967 deaths
Irish Antarctic explorers
People from Kinsale
Recipients of the Polar Medal
Royal Navy sailors
Terra Nova expedition